

W
 WA   - Western Railway of Alabama; Seaboard System Railroad; CSX Transportation
 WAB  - Wabash Railroad; Norfolk Southern
 WACR - Washington County Railroad
 WACX - PCS Phosphate Company
 WAG  - Wellsville, Addison and Galeton Railroad
 WAGX - PCS Phosphate Company
 WAL  - Western Allegheny Railroad
 WAMX - Watco Transportation Services, L.L.C.
 WAR  - Warrenton Railroad
 WAS  - Waynesburg Southern
 WATC - Washington Terminal Company
 WATR - Waterville Railroad
 WAW  - Conrail
 WBC  - Wilkes-Barre Connecting Railroad
 WBCX - Williams Brothers Concrete
 WBMX - Lauhoff Grain Company
 WBTS - Waco, Beaumont, Trinity and Sabine Railway
 WC   - Wisconsin Central Railway; Canadian National Railway
 WCCL - Wisconsin Central Railway; Canadian National Railway
 WCDX - Far-Mar-Co, Inc.
 WCE - West Coast Express
 WCHX - Walter Haffner Company
 WCRC - Washington Central Railroad
 WCRX - United Grain Corporation
 WCTR - WCTU Railway
 WCTX - West Central Cooperative
 WDRR - White Deer and Reading Railroad
 WDTX - Washington State Department of Transportation
 WE   - Wheeling and Lake Erie Railway (current)
 WECX - Westinghouse Electric Corporation
 WEIX - Wilbur-Ellis Company
 WELX - Welland Chemical, Inc.
 WEPX - Wisconsin Electric Power Company
 WERZ - Werner Enterprises
 WESX - BC Timber, Ltd.
 WFAX - Western Fuels Association, Inc.
 WFCX - Western Farmers Electric Cooperative
 WFE  - Western Fruit Express; Burlington Northern Railroad
 WFIX - WFIX Partners; First Union Rail
 WGBX - W. G. Block Company
 WGCR - Wiregrass Central Railroad
 WGRR - Williams and Grand Ronde Railroad
 WHCX - Western Hay Corporation
 WHI  - Burlington Northern Railroad
 WHN  - Conrail
 WHSX - GE Rail Services
 WICT - Wisconsin and Calumet Railroad
 WIF  - West India Fruit and Steamship Company
 WIGX - Wigeon Car Company
 WISX - Wisconsin Power and Light
 WITX - Continental Carbon Company
 WIWR - Wisconsin Western Railroad
 WKRL - Western Kentucky Railway
 WLE  - Wheeling and Lake Erie Railway (former)
 WLFB - Wolfeboro Railroad
 WLO  - Waterloo Railway
 WLPX - West Lake Polymers
 WLRL - Washington-Lincoln Railink
 WM   - Western Maryland Railroad; Baltimore and Ohio Railroad; Chessie System; CSX Transportation
 WMI  - West Michigan Railroad
 WMSC - White Mountain Scenic Railroad
 WMSR - Western Maryland Scenic Railroad
 WMTZ - Wal-Mart Transportation
 WMWN - Weatherford, Mineral Wells and Northwestern Railway
 WN   - Wisconsin Northern Railroad
 WNF  - Winfield Railroad
 WNFR - Winnifrede Railroad
 WNGX - Western Natural Gas Company
 WNYP - Western New York and Pennsylvania Railroad
 WOD  - Washington and Old Dominion Railroad
 WOPR - West Oakland Pacific Railroad
 WP   - Western Pacific Railroad; Union Pacific Railroad
 WPGX - Western Paving Construction Company
 WPLX - GE Rail Services
 WPMW - Western Pacific Railroad (Maintenance of way)
 WPRR - Willamette and Pacific Railroad
 WPSX - Wisconsin Public Service Corporation
 WPY  - White Pass and Yukon Route
 WRA  - Western Railway of Alabama; Seaboard System Railroad; CSX Transportation
 WRDX - Iowa-Illinois Gas and Electric Company
 WREX - Western Refrigerator Express
 WRL  - Western Refrigerator Line, Washington Royal Line
 WRLX - Relco Tank Line
 WRNX - Gulf Oil Products Company; Chevron USA, Inc.
 WRPX - Public Service Company of Indiana
 WRRC - Western Rail Road Company
 WRSX - Scholle Corporation
 WRTX - Western Rail Leasing Corporation
 WRWK - Providence and Worcester Railroad
 WRX  - Western Refrigerator Line Company
 WS   - Ware Shoals Railroad
 WSCX - Buffalo Brake Beam Company
 WSJR - Goderich-Exeter Railway
 WSOR - Wisconsin and Southern Railroad
 WSOX - Wisconsin and Southern Leasing Company
 WSR  - Warren and Saline River Railroad
 WSRC - West Shore Railroad Corporation
 WSS  - Winston-Salem Southbound Railway
 WSX  - National Steel Corporation (Weirton Steel Division)
 WSYP - White Sulphur Springs and Yellowstone Park Railway
 WT   - Weldwood Transportation, Ltd., Wyandotte Terminal Railroad
 WTA  - Wichita Terminal Association
 WTCO - Watco Railways
 WTCX - Weyerhaeuser Company
 WTOH - Western Ohio Railroad
 WTRY - Wilmington Terminal Railroad
 WTSE - West Shore Railroad Corporation
 WTTX - Trailer Train Company
 WURR - Wallowa Union Railroad
 WUT  - Wichita Union Terminal Railway
 WUTX - Washington Utilities and Transportation Commission (scale test cars)
 WVCX -  Westvaco Corporation
 WVN  - West Virginia Northern Railroad
 WVRR - Whitewater Valley Railroad
 WW   - Winchester and Western Railroad
 WWR  - Washington Western, Western Washington Railroad
 WWRC - Wilmington & Western Railroad
 WWLX - LaRoche Industries, Inc.
 WWPX - Willimantic Waste Paper, Inc.
 WWSX - Standard Car Truck Company
 WWUX - Unimin
 WYCX - Weyerhauser Canada, Ltd.
 WYS  - Wyandotte Southern Railroad

W